Heather Miller Podesta (born January 8, 1970) is an American lawyer and lobbyist based in Washington, D.C. She is also a patron of contemporary art.

Career
In 2007, Podesta founded Heather Podesta + Partners, which is the nation's largest woman-owned government relations firm.  As a lobbyist, Podesta's clients include the energy, finance, healthcare, retail, real estate, education, transportation, and weapons sectors.  She previously worked as a congressional aide to members of Congress, including US Representatives Robert Matsui and Earl Pomeroy, and US Senator Bill Bradley. She also served as assistant general counsel at the Air Transport Association and general counsel at the Airlines Clearing House.

Podesta was once known for supporting and advising Democratic candidates across the country.  In the 2012 federal election cycle, Podesta and her colleagues bundled more than $300,000 on behalf of the Democratic Senatorial Campaign Committee, Democratic Congressional Campaign Committee, the Senate Majority PAC, and individual Democratic candidates.
Recently, Podesta renamed her firm from "Heather Podesta + Partners" to "Invariant". The firm now has a bipartisan team, and has lobbied for large insurance corporations Prudential and New York Life among others.

The National Journal ranked Podesta as one of "Washington's Most Influential Women,"  GQ named her one of the "50 Most Powerful People in Washington," and The Hill has repeatedly named her one of its "Top Lobbyists". In 2010, the National Law Journal ranked Podesta as one of "Washington's Most Influential Women Lawyers".

She received her J.D. degree from the University of Virginia Law School and graduated with honors from the University of California, Berkeley, where she now sits on the National Advisory Council of the Institute of Governmental Studies. In addition, Podesta is a member of the Board of Trustees of Ford's Theatre and serves on the Washington D.C. Police Foundation Board.

Rebranding lobbying firm to Invariant 

On March 29, 2017, Podesta rebranded her lobbying firm, Heather Podesta + Partners by changing the name to Invariant. The rebranding was done to reflect the firm's expanding client list and expanding bipartisan team of lobbyists. In the firm's online manifesto, Podesta has publicly highlighted the group's growing number of Republican lobbyists as a strength and takes pride in their bipartisan work.

Art collection
Podesta, a member of the Board of Trustees of the Museum of Contemporary Art, Los Angeles, is an avid collector of contemporary art.

Named by ARTnews as one of the 200 top collectors in 2012 and 2013, she was also named one of the "Philanthropic 50" by Washington Life in 2010.

In 2009, Podesta donated Shepard Fairey's iconic Barack Obama "Hope" poster to the National Portrait Gallery in Washington, DC.

Personal life

Heather Podesta grew up as Heather Miller, one of two daughters of Sandy and Jill Miller of Brighton. Sanford Miller is a distinguished professor of mathematics at SUNY Brockport. Leslie Jill Miller, now retired, was an executive with Xerox Corp.

Podesta was named by Washingtonian as a "Style Setter."

Married in 2003, she divorced in 2014 from Tony Podesta.

References

External links

1970 births
American art collectors
American lobbyists
American political fundraisers
Businesspeople from Washington, D.C.
Living people
Lawyers from Rochester, New York
United States congressional aides
Washington, D.C., Democrats